Viktor Pitirimov (born 2 June 1968) is a Soviet rower. He competed in the men's coxless four event at the 1992 Summer Olympics. His daughter, Ekaterina, rowed at the 2020 Summer Olympics.

References

External links
 

1968 births
Living people
Soviet male rowers
Olympic rowers of the Unified Team
Rowers at the 1992 Summer Olympics
Place of birth missing (living people)